The Homeland Security Council (HSC) is an entity within the Executive Office of the President of the United States tasked with advising the President on matters relevant to Homeland Security. The current Homeland Security Advisor is Elizabeth Sherwood-Randall.

History

It served as the successor to the Office of Homeland Security, established on September 20, 2001, immediately after the September 11 attacks. Congress subsequently codified the HSC in the Homeland Security Act of 2002, charging it with advising the President on homeland security matters.

On February 23, 2009, the Obama administration released Presidential Study Directive 1. This memorandum ordered a 60-day inter-agency review of the White House homeland security and counter-terrorism structure. The review recommended that the president merge the staff supporting the Homeland Security Council with the staff supporting the National Security Council. On May 26, 2009, Barack Obama signed the recommendation to merge the Homeland Security Council and National Security Council staffs into one National Security Staff. On February 10, 2014, President Obama renamed the National Security Staff the National Security Council (NSC) staff.

Policymakers and observers have debated whether the HSC staff should remain an independent entity within the White House or merged with the NSC staff. The HSC and NSC continue to exist by statute as independent councils of leadership advising the president.

Mission
The Homeland Security Council is responsible for assessing the objectives, commitments, and risks of the United States, and for making recommendations to the president with respect to homeland security policy.

Structure
The HSC was similar to its national security counterpart, the National Security Council (NSC), which was established in the National Security Act of 1947. The HSC also maintained structural similarities with the NSC; the HSC consisted of full-time staff organized by subject areas relating to homeland security missions, with the Council itself being composed of Cabinet members and senior White House officials whose departments have principal interests in homeland security policy-making. During the Bush administration, the council was chaired by the Homeland Security Advisor. The Joint Chiefs of Staff consist of the primary military advisers to the Homeland Security Council, as well as the National Security Council. Due to the recommendations implemented by Obama, the Homeland Security Council and the National Security Council now have combined staff, the National Security Staff (NSS).

While similar in name, the Department of Homeland Security is a distinct federal executive department; unlike DHS, the HSC functioned as part of the Executive Office of the President, drawing staff from across federal agencies and under the direct control of the president.

Membership

See also 
 Homeland Security Advisor
 National Security Advisor
 United States National Security Council

References

2001 establishments in the United States
Disaster preparedness in the United States
Executive Office of the President of the United States